Barnes Cray is an area in south-east London within the London Borough of Bexley. It is located on the Greater London border with Kent, bordering the Dartford Borough. It is located north west of Dartford.

History

Up until the Victorian era it was a hamlet a kilometre downstream of Crayford where no more than sixteen homes were clustered. A calico-printing works drew water power from the culverted River Wansunt in early Victorian times, being later adapted for the manufacture of rubber goods, then felt and finally Brussels carpets. This carpet mill was demolished by 1890 and Barnes Cray House, the next largest building, was cleared by 1933, ending its days as a nursing home.

The remnants of the settlement became absorbed into Crayford with the building of a munition village to facilitate the expansion of Vickers' armaments factory during the 1915 to 1919 period.
In 1920 the area became part of the Crayford Urban District of Kent (having previously been in Dartford Rural District). 
Following World War I Crayford Urban District Council erected further housing estates to the north, eventually merging with estates spreading southwards from Erith. In 1965, under the London Government Act 1963, the urban district was abolished and its area transferred to Greater London to form part of the present-day London Borough of Bexley.

The Geoffrey Whitworth Theatre is in Barnes Cray.

The site of the current Barnes Cray Primary School is the proposed site for a new Academy for ages 3–19, which was consulted upon from September - December 2008, and the primary school will convert to the Academy in September 2009, with the secondary part of the Academy due to open in September 2010.

Transport
Barnes Cray is served by the Transport for London bus service 428 to Erith via Slade Green and to Bluewater via Dartford. The nearest rail link to the area is at Crayford station.

Nearest places
Crayford
Slade Green
Dartford
Barnehurst

References

Areas of London
Districts of the London Borough of Bexley